"The Scarlet Citadel" is one of the original short stories starring  the fictional sword and sorcery hero Conan the Cimmerian, written by American author Robert E. Howard and first published in the January, 1933 issue of Weird Tales magazine. In the pseudo-historical Hyborian Age, a middle-aged Conan battles rival kingdoms. The wizard Tsotha-lanti ensnares King Conan, who escapes a dungeon with unexpected aid. 

The story was republished in the collections King Conan (Gnome Press, 1953) and Conan the Usurper (Lancer Books,, 1967). It has more recently been published in the collections The Conan Chronicles Volume 2: The Hour of the Dragon (Gollancz, 2001) and Conan of Cimmeria: Volume One (1932-1933) (Del Rey, 2003).

Plot summary
An older, wiser King Conan of Aquilonia receives a call for help from Amalrus, the ruler of neighbouring Ophir. Amalrus claims that Strabonus, the Emperor of Koth, is threatening his kingdom.

Conan marches into Ophir with an army of five thousand Aquilonian knights. His planned campaign is a trap; the two monarchs are working together to destroy him with the help of a Kothian wizard named Tsotha-lanti. The Aquilonian knights are cut to pieces while Conan is imprisoned within a Korshemish dungeon. This dungeon is used by Tsotha-lanti for nefarious experiments, and Conan discovers bizarre horrors during his escape.

Conan frees Pelias, a former rival wizard of Tsotha-lanti, who helps him escape the dungeon and regain his position as king of Aquilonia. The story climaxes with a gigantic battle, where Tsotha-lanti meets a grisly fate at the hands of Pelias.

Reception
Robert Weinberg described "The Scarlet Citadel" as "Howard at his best", and praised the character of Pelias.

Adaptation
The story was adapted by Roy Thomas and Frank Brunner in Savage Sword of Conan #30 in 1978, then by Tim Truman and Tomas Giorello in 2011 in King Conan: The Scarlet Citadel.

References

External links

 The Scarlet Citadel at Project Gutenberg
 Conan the Barbarian at AmratheLion.com
 Conan.com: The Official Website

1933 short stories
Conan the Barbarian stories by Robert E. Howard
Pulp stories
Horror short stories
Fantasy short stories
Works originally published in Weird Tales